Theater k.l.a.s. was an Austrian theatre company which performed each summer at the Haimburg Castle. It was founded by the lighting and set designer  and the theatre director . Its first production was Büchner's Woyzeck (1995), and its last production was Shakespeare's Macbeth (2009). The company went into liquidation and ceased operating in June 2010 shortly before what was to have been its 16th season. Over the years 70,000 people had attended its performances at the castle.

References

External links

Theatre production companies
Theatre in Austria